Upstate New York has been the setting for inventions and businesses of international significance.  The abundance of water power and the advent of canal and rail transportation provided nineteenth century Upstate New York entrepreneurs with the means to power factories and send their products to market.  In the twentieth century, hydroelectric power and the New York State Thruway served the same roles. In April 2021, GlobalFoundries, a company specializing in the semiconductor industry, moved its headquarters from Silicon Valley, California to its most advanced semiconductor-chip manufacturing facility in Saratoga County, New York near a section of the Adirondack Northway, in Malta, New York.

Inventors and business leaders
George Herman Babcock, born in Unadilla Forks, co-invented an improved safety water tube steam boiler. Together with Stephen Wilcox he founded the Babcock & Wilcox boiler company.
Robert C. Baker, the "Thomas Edison of poultry," a Lansing native and  food science professor at Cornell University.
Katharine Burr Blodgett of Schenectady was the first woman to be awarded a Ph.D. in Physics from University of Cambridge in 1926. After receiving her master's degree, she was hired by General Electric, where she invented low-reflectance "invisible" glass.
James Bogardus, born in Catskill, was an inventor and architect, the pioneer of American cast-iron architecture.
Charles F. Brannock of Syracuse was the inventor and manufacturer of the familiar Brannock Device for measuring the foot.
Willard Bundy, the inventor of the time clock for recording employee working hours.
Theodore Burr
William Seward Burroughs I, born in Rochester, was an inventor.
Paolo Busti
John Warren Butterfield (1801–1869) was an operator of stagecoach and freight lines in the mid-19th century in the American Northeast and Southwest. He founded companies that became American Express and Wells Fargo. 
Willis Carrier, the inventor of air conditioning, Cornell graduate, invented air conditioning while in Buffalo
Theodore Case of Auburn is known for the invention of the Movietone sound-on-film sound film system.
William Russell Case of Little Valley, founder of the cutlery company that bears his name
George Cogar of Herkimer
Harry Coover, inventor of Krazy Glue
Ezra Cornell
Erastus Corning
Charles Crocker
George Crum, the head chef of Moon's Lake House, a resort in Saratoga Springs, and the inventor of the potato chip.
Glenn Curtiss
Abner Doubleday
Charles F. Dowd of Saratoga Springs, who first proposed standard time zones for American railroads
Frederick W. Eames of Watertown, inventor of a vacuum brake for railroad cars. His company was reorganized as the New York Air Brake company, which continues to operate.
George Eastman
Joseph Ellicott
William Fargo, Mayor of Buffalo and founder of the American Express Company
Henry Farnam, born in Scipio
Dr. Konstantin Frank, viticulturalist
Carl Frink of Clayton, an innovator in the snow plow manufacturing industry
Robert Fulton, whose steamboat the Clermont (steamboat) served the Hudson River between New York City and Albany
Orville Gibson
Dr. B. F. Goodrich, founder of the tire company that bears his name, was born in Ripley.
Stephen Gordon, Plattsburgh native and founder of Restoration Hardware
Jay Gould of Roxbury, a financier who became a leading American railroad developer and speculator.
William Henry Gunlocke, furniture manufacturer
George Franklin Grant, born in Oswego and the inventor of the modern golf tee
Wilson Greatbatch, who advanced the development of the pacemaker
Seth Green, pioneer in fish farming, inventor of the fish hatchery
Robert Gundlach, born near Buffalo, made prolific contributions to the field of xerography, specifically the development of the modern photocopier. Gundlach helped transform the Haloid Company, a small photographic firm, into the Xerox Corporation.
Jesse Hawley of Geneva, influential proponent of the Erie Canal
Herman Hollerith, born in Buffalo, a statistician who developed a mechanical tabulator based on punched cards. His company was eventually merged into others to form IBM.
Birdsill Holly
Mark Hopkins, Jr.
the Houghton family of the Corning Glass Works
Elbert Hubbard
Jeremy Jacobs, founder of Delaware North Companies, and his family
John B. Jervis
John Augustus Just
John D. Larkin of the Larkin Soap Company, who commissioned the Larkin Administration Building from Frank Lloyd Wright
William Pryor Letchworth, founder of Pratt & Letchworth malleable ironworks and creator of Letchworth State Park. 
Edwin Albert Link
Darwin D. Martin
David Maydole, blacksmith and inventor of adz-eye hammer construction method. He founded the Maydole Hammer Factory, once the largest hammer factory in the nation, in Norwich.
William Henry Miner, railroad equipment manufacturer, philanthropist, founder of the Miner Institute at Heart's Delight Farm in Chazy
Hannah Lord Montague of Troy, inventor of the detachable shirt collar
Robert Moog, who invented the music synthesizer while a graduate student at Cornell University. He founded his company Moog Music in Trumansburg.
Edward John Noble, born in Gouverneur, founder of the Life Savers Candy Company and the American Broadcasting Company
Carl Paladino, founder of the Ellicott Development Co.
Ralph Peo, Chairman of Houdaille Industries, inventor of early Automobile air conditioning and shock absorbers
Karl Peterson, founder of the Crescent Tool Company of Jamestown, New York, maker of Crescent wrenches.
Francis Ashbury Pratt, born in Peru, was a mechanical engineer, inventor, and cofounder of Pratt & Whitney.
Zadock Pratt, from Prattsville, was a tanner, banker, soldier, and member of the United States House of Representatives.
Robert C. Pruyn
Eliphalet Remington, firearms and typewriter manufacturer. The Remington typewriter, later manufactured by Remington Rand, was the first typewriter to use the QWERTY keyboard layout,
Robert E. Rich, Sr. of Buffalo, was a food-processing pioneer who, in 1945, invented the first non-dairy whipped topping that could be frozen.
Julius Sämann, inventor of Little Trees
Steven Sasson, the inventor of the digital camera
Ben Serotta, builder of custom racing bicycle
Isaac Singer, founder of the Singer Sewing Machine Company
L. C. Smith, typewriter innovator and founder of the company that became Smith-Corona
Elmer Ambrose Sperry, born at Cincinnatus, was a prolific inventor and entrepreneur], most famous as co-inventor, with Herman Anschütz-Kaempfe of the gyrocompass.
Edward C. Stearns
Charles Proteus Steinmetz
Walter S. Taylor, founder of Bully Hill Vineyards
Spencer Trask, Saratoga Springs venture capitalist and philanthropist, who backed Thomas Edison, rescued the New York Times and founded the artists' colony Yaddo
Hamdi Ulukaya
Webster Wagner, an inventor of the railroad sleeping car and the parlor car. Born in Palatine Bridge, he founded the Webster Palace Car Company in Buffalo
Thomas J. Watson of IBM
Henry Wells, founder of American Express, Wells Fargo, and Wells College
George West, "The Paper Bag King"
George Westinghouse, born in Central Bridge
Samuel Wilson, namesake of Uncle Sam
Jethro Wood, inventor of a cast-iron plow with replaceable parts
Frank Winfield Woolworth
Benjamin Wright
Linus Yale, Jr., Inventor of the Yale Lock
Owen D. Young, founder of RCA

Inventions
the Adirondack chair
Automobile air conditioning
the Brannock Device
the chicken nugget
the chicken barbecue
the detachable collar
the digital camera
CorningWare
the Dewey Decimal System
the fish hatchery
the  five and dime
the flight simulator
Jell-O
Krazy Glue, invented by Harry Coover while working at Eastman Kodak in 1942.
The Lightning sailboat.  The design was commissioned by the Skaneateles Boat Company, who then first produced it.
Little Trees, the pine-tree-shaped air freshener for cars
the square-bottomed paper bag
the mail chute
Pepto-Bismol
the photocopier, introduced by the Rochester firm Xerox in 1949
Pie a la Mode
the pin tumbler lock
the plank road
the potato chip
powdered milk
the punched card and the keypunch
the roll of film
the Shock absorber
the Shot Clock, first used in basketball by the National Basketball Association's Syracuse Nationals
Standard time zones for American railroads
the talking movie
the time recording clock and the time card
Unguentine, introduced In 1893 to the medical profession by Norwich Pharmaceuticals as the first antiseptic surgical dressing. 
the gasoline pump shut-off valve

Products and manufacturers
The Adirondack baseball bat, made in Dolgeville, New York, of local white ash, originally by the McLaughlin-Millard Company  McLaughlin-Millard was bought by the Rawlings company in 1975.  The bats, now labeled Rawlings Adirondack, are used by about one-third of major leaguers.
Bicycles, built in Syracuse by the E. C. Stearns Bicycle Agency.  For a period in the 1890s, Stearns was the largest manufacturer of bicycles in the world.
Buffalo Forge Company, manufacturers of forges, drills, fans and other machinery
Arrow shirts
Carrier Corporation
Cool Whip, manufactured in Avon
The Crescent Wrench, originally the brand name for the product of the Crescent Tool Company of Jamestown.The term crescent wrench has become a generic term in North America for any adjustable wrench.
R. E. Dietz Company
Endicott Johnson Corporation
Fisher-Price Toys
IBM
Kittinger Company, maker of colonial reproduction furniture
Locomotives, built in Schenectady by the American Locomotive Company
Mohawk Industries
Nickelodeon, the first children's television channel, was introduced in Buffalo under the name "Pinwheel" in 1977. After going nationwide, it later moved to Florida and then to California.
Rosendale cement
Sailplanes, made by Schweizer Aircraft in Horseheads
Salt, made from brine in Syracuse and mined in Western New York
Shock absorbers, manufactured by Houdaille Industries
Shredded Wheat was invented by Henry Perky of Denver, Colorado.  He and William Henry Ford of Watertown, working in Watertown, invented and patented the first machinery for the production of Shredded Wheat.  In 1901, drawn by inexpensive electrical power for baking, Perky built a new plant at Niagara Falls. A representation of the factory appeared on the Shredded Wheat boxes for decades.
Smith Corona
Trico, windshield wiper
M. Wile & Co., manufacturer of men's suits
The Wurlitzer organ and jukebox, made in North Tonawanda

References 

New York (state)-related lists
Upstate New York